This is a list of lighthouses in Lebanon.

Lighthouses

See also
 Lists of lighthouses and lightvessels

References

External links

 

Lebanon
Lighthouses
Lighthouses